Tracks is a 1976 American drama film written and directed by Henry Jaglom and starring Dennis Hopper, Taryn Power and Dean Stockwell. The story involves a returned Vietnam veteran escorting a fellow soldier's coffin across the United States for burial.

Plot
In 1973, 1st Sgt. Jack Falen (Hopper) returns from the Vietnam War to the United States to escort a friend's body for a hometown burial. Once in the US, Jack travels across the country via train (hence the film's title), where he meets the mysterious Mark (Stockwell) and the alluring university student Stephanie (Power). During the trip, Jack falls in love with Stephanie, but destroys the relationship through constant flashbacks to combat.

Cast
Dennis Hopper as 1st Sgt. Jack Falen
Taryn Power as Stephanie
Dean Stockwell as Mark
Topo Swope as Chloe
Alfred Ryder as The Man
Zack Norman as Gene
Michael Emil as Emile
Barbara Flood as The Lady
Frank McRae as Train Coachman
James Frawley as Train Passenger
Sally Kirkland as Train Passenger

Production
Following the production of A Safe Place, Jaglom spent five years putting together $1 million to shoot Tracks.

References

External links

 
 
 

1976 films
1976 drama films
American drama films
Films about veterans
Films set on trains
Vietnam War films
1970s English-language films
Films directed by Henry Jaglom
1970s American films